Hints Allegations and Things Left Unsaid is the debut studio album by American rock band Collective Soul, it was originally released on an indie label in Atlanta called Rising Storm Records in 1993, Collective Soul later signed on with Atlantic Records and the album was rereleased in 1994 under the Atlantic label. The track "Shine" gained the band attention thanks to college radio.

The cover art is a modified and colored version of a nineteenth century advertising image, with the album's title added to the sign. The opening track, "Shine", would arguably become Collective Soul's biggest hit.

Background and release
Hints, Allegations and Things Left Unsaid was recorded in a basement in 1992 as a promotional demo. Frontman Ed Roland hoped to simply sell the songs to a publishing company rather than form a band. He gave the demo to a small college radio station in Atlanta that began playing "Shine". The track quickly became their most requested song and the band was asked to perform some concerts for the station. Favoring an opportunity to perform a few shows with his brother, Roland agreed and regathered the demo's guitarist and drummer as well as his brother Dean.

The attention gained by "Shine" allowed it to chart and catapulted the band to national stardom. They were soon picked up by Atlantic Records who wished to release the demo as the debut studio album of Collective Soul. In a 1995 interview, Roland elaborated on his mixed feelings regarding the situation:
"It wasn't even remixed. It was the same demo. Before we got signed we'd already charted with 'Shine.' Once we got signed I said, 'We want to re-record. This is not a band recording.' But they said, 'You're gonna lose momentum. You're looking at a three to five month process. So let's go with it and you can get your next record out quick.' We thought it would be great to sell 10-20,000 units. [When it went gold], we were sitting there with our eyes wide open."

Consequently, Collective Soul would regard their self-titled 1995 studio album under Atlantic as the band's official debut. Roland told Metal Edge, "It's so funny for people to compare the two. It's like comparing one band to another band. [Collective Soul] is our first record, flat out."

The album was produced by Matt Serletic, becoming his first production success, and who would then subsequently go on to much wider fame producing all of Matchbox 20's releases as well as those by their frontman Rob Thomas, including his Santana collaboration Smooth.

Promotion and touring
Hints, Allegations, and Things Left Unsaid featured three singles, the most successful of which was "Shine". Aside from radio popularity, the song also had a music video which received heavy airplay on MTV.

Collective Soul performed at Woodstock 1994 and opened for Aerosmith during their Get a Grip Tour.

Reception

The album gained overall positive reception from critics. It was given credit for its strong melodies but a less savory response regarding its apparent lack of originality. Also of note was Collective Soul's more upbeat sound amidst their more angst, grunge-influenced contemporaries.

Chuck Eddy of Entertainment Weekly gave a somewhat sarcastic review, describing the album as "bubble-gum grunge: an idea whose time has come."

In The Village Voice, Robert Christgau was even more negative, singling it out in Consumers Guide "Turkey Shoot" feature as a "Must to Avoid", an example of "...mediocre pseudoalternatives from every corner of this embittered, all too grateful land of ours."

Track listing
All songs written by Ed Roland.

CD Single B-Sides contained the tracks "Why" and "Almost You". "Why" is a track that was the cause for the Blender track "Why Part 2. "Almost You" is the same track that later showed up as a bonus track for Dosage. It was reworked slightly.

Personnel
Although Ed Roland has stated that the musicians on the recording Hints Allegations and Things Left Unsaid were entirely different from Collective Soul's subsequent recordings, the following people are credited in its Atlantic reissue:

Collective Soul
 Ed Roland – lead vocals, guitar
 Dean Roland – rhythm guitar
 Ross Childress – lead guitar, backing vocals
 Will Turpin – bass, backing vocals
 Shane Evans – drums

Additional musicians
 Matt Serletic – keyboards, trombones and string arrangements on "Sister Don't Cry" and "Pretty Donna"
 Joe Randolph – guitar on "Goodnight, Good Guy", "Love Lifted Me" and "Scream"
 Brian Howell – bass on "Scream"
 Melissa Ortega – solo violin on "Wasting Time"

String ensemble
 Jun-Ching Lin – leader, violin I
 David Braitberg – violin II
 Paul Murphy – viola
 Daniel Laufer – cello

Production
 Ed Roland – producer, mixer, engineer
 Matthew Serletic – producer, mixer, engineer, mastering
 Joe Randolph – producer
 Bill Richardson – executive producer
 Mike Childers – digital editing, artwork, DTP
 Mario Castellanos – photography

Charts

Weekly charts

Year-end charts

Certifications

References

1993 debut albums
Albums produced by Ed Roland
Albums produced by Matt Serletic
Atlantic Records albums
Collective Soul albums
Demo albums